The Warsaw Open, formerly the J&S Cup, was a women's tennis tournament on the WTA Tour held in Warsaw, Poland. Held since 1995, the tournament was played on outdoor clay courts. The event returned for two years to the WTA Tour in 2009 after a year's hiatus but its slot on the tour calendar was taken over by the Brussels Open from 2011.

Past finals

Singles

Doubles

See also
 List of tennis tournaments

References

External links
Official website

 
Recurring sporting events established in 1995
Sports competitions in Warsaw
Tennis tournaments in Poland
Clay court tennis tournaments
WTA Tour
Recurring sporting events disestablished in 2010
1995 establishments in Poland
2010 disestablishments in Poland